Eric Barone, also known by his alias ConcernedApe, is an American video game developer, video game designer, artist, composer, and musician. He is best known for creating Stardew Valley.

Early life and education 
Barone was born in Los Angeles and spent his childhood in Auburn, Washington, a suburb in the Seattle metropolitan area. He cites the Harvest Moon series as his favorite as a child. He attended the University of Washington Tacoma and graduated in 2011 with a degree in computer science. Barone had practiced basic programming but did not consider making video games as a career. Unable to find employment after graduating college, he initially began developing Stardew Valley in order to practice programming in C#, and planned to put the game on his resume for potential employers.

Career

Stardew Valley 

Barone began working on Stardew Valley in 2012 and released it in 2016. He was praised for creating the game independently, as its sole designer, programmer, animator, artist, composer, and writer. To complete the game, Barone worked 10 hours a day, seven days a week, for four and a half years; living in Capitol Hill, Seattle. For part of that time, he lived with his parents to save money after which he and his then girlfriend moved in together. During this time his girlfriend worked 2 jobs to support the both of them while Barone worked a part-time job as an evening usher at the Paramount Theatre . 

Barone initially released Stardew on the PC before later developing it for other consoles. By March 2022, he had sold over 20 million copies. 

In 2017, he was named by Forbes magazine in their list "30 Under 30: Games" due to his work on Stardew Valley. Since 2019, Barone has been assisted on Stardew Valley by another designer.

Other projects 
In 2020 Barone announced that he was working on several new games, with one of them set in the Stardew Valley universe. In February 2021, Barone and board game designer Cole Meideros released a cooperative board game adaptation of Stardew Valley. After the first printing of the game went on sale, it quickly sold out. Sales were later reopened with several changes.

In October 2021, Barone announced that a new game titled Haunted Chocolatier was in development, with no set release date. In the game, the player will run a chocolate shop. It will have a greater focus on combat than in Stardew Valley. Barone stated that "almost everything in Haunted Chocolatier, including the combat, is completely coded (and drawn) from scratch."

Barone collaborated with Norihiko Hibino on an album series Prescription for Sleep. The series remixes video game soundtracks with piano and saxophone. The Stardew Valley album was released in May 2021. It includes 10 tracks from the game's original soundtrack and one new track called "Beauty in the Seasons".

Barone collaborated on an animated music video with indie pop band Alvvays for the band's song Many Mirrors. Barone is responsible for the video's animation and it was his first time working with 3D animation.

References 

Video game developers
American video game designers
Musicians from Seattle
American composers
Living people
Artists from Seattle
University of Washington alumni
1987 births
Video game composers
Video game artists